Skater Island was a skate park located in Middletown, Rhode Island, USA.

This park was bought by the Flynn, Hall and O'Niel families of Rhode Island because residents in the state felt the need for such a recreation area to support people's interest in sports related to the facility. The park included state-of-the-art designs for skateboarders and for bikers. The park was featured in Tony Hawk's Pro Skater 3 in 2001.

The park was closed in May 2004 as a result of the building's roof collapsing.

References

External links
 A video in memory of the fallen skate park

Buildings and structures in Middletown, Rhode Island